The AI Song Contest 2020 was the inaugural edition of the AI Song Contest, organised by the Dutch public broadcaster VPRO, in collaboration with NPO 3FM and NPO Innovation. It was held on 12 May 2020 in the Netherlands and was presented by Lieven Scheire. Thirteen teams from eight countries participated in the contest.  The contest was won by Uncanny Valley from Australia with the song "Beautiful the World".

Format 
Each participating team had to submit a "Eurovision-like" song of up to three minutes that had been composed using artificial intelligence (AI). Human input was allowed, but the more AI was used, the more points the entry would get from the jury. The entries were also evaluated by the public through online ratings. The winner was announced in a live show on 12 May 2020.

Presenter and spokespersons 
The live show was hosted by Belgian comedian Lieven Scheire. The points from the online voting were announced by Dutch television presenter Emma Wortelboer, who had been the Netherlands' spokesperson for the Eurovision Song Contest 2019. Dutch composer and AI researcher Vincent Koops revealed the points awarded by the jury.

Expert panel 
The jury consisted of three AI experts, who assessed each entry based on the use of artificial intelligence in the songwriting process:

  Vincent Koops (RTL Nederland)
  Anna Huang (Google Brain)
  Ed Newton-Rex (ByteDance)

Competing entries 
The live show took place on 12 May 2020 at 20:30 CEST and was broadcast via a live stream on YouTube. As there were no pre-qualifying rounds, multiple teams from each country could enter the competition. The contest featured the following competing entries:

See also 
 Eurovision Song Contest 2020
 Eurovision: Europe Shine a Light

External links 
 Official website

References 

2020 in the Netherlands
2020 song contests
Artificial intelligence art
Computer music
May 2020 events in the Netherlands